Petkovski, female form Petkovska is a Macedonian surname that is the equivalent of Bulgarian Petkov, it may refer to:

 Alexandra Petkovski
 Tito Petkovski (b. 1945), Yugoslav and Macedonian politician
 Dragana Petkovska
 Ivana Petkovska, represented Macedonia in the Junior Eurovision Song Contest 2015

See also 
 Petković
 Petkov

Macedonian-language surnames